A cygnet is a young swan.

Cygnet may also refer to:

Places
Cygnet Island, a small islet in south-eastern Australia
Cygnet, Ohio, a village in the United States
Cygnet River, South Australia, a locality on Kangaroo Island
Cygnet, Tasmania, a town in Australia

Vehicles
Cygnet (ship), several ships
Aston Martin Cygnet, a City car manufactured by Aston Martin
General Aircraft Cygnet, a 1930s British light aircraft
Hawker Cygnet, a British ultralight biplane aircraft of the 1920s
Roberts Cygnet, glider

Other
Cygnet Cinema, a cinema located at 16 Preston Street, Como, Western Australia
Cygnet Committee, a song written by David Bowie in 1969
Cygnet Rowing Club, a rowing club founded in 1890 on the River Thames in England
Cygnet Theatre Company, a theatre company in San Diego, California
AEA Cygnet, a tetrahedral kite designed by Dr. Alexander Graham Bell and flown by First Lieutenant Thomas Selfridge
Cygnet Healthcare

See also
Golden Cygnet, a racehorse
Sea and Sky Cygnet, an American amphibious ultralight trike design
Signet (disambiguation)